Alpenus affiniola is a species of moth of the  family Erebidae. It was described by Embrik Strand in 1919. It is found in Senegal, Ghana and Nigeria.

References

Moths described in 1919
Erebid moths of Africa